Henri-Alexandre Danlos (26 March 1844 – 12 September 1912) was a French physician and dermatologist born in Paris. With Danish dermatologist Edvard Ehlers (1863-1937), the Ehlers–Danlos syndromes, which comprise a group of inherited connective-tissue disorders, are named for him.

He studied medicine in Paris, and during the early part of his career, performed research in the laboratory of Charles-Adolphe Wurtz (1817-1884). In 1881, he became médecin des hôpitaux, and four years later was chef de service at the Hôpital Tenon in Paris. In 1895, he received an appointment at the Hôpital Saint-Louis.

Danlos was pioneer in the use of radium for treatment of lupus erythematosus of the skin, and in 1901 with physicist Eugène Bloch (1878-1944), he was the first to apply radium on tuberculous skin lesions.

References

External links
 Henri-Alexandre Danlos @ Who Named It

French dermatologists
Physicians from Paris
1844 births
1912 deaths